George Wetzel Bradshaw (1909–1973) was an American writer and journalist.

Life 
George Wetzel Bradshaw was born in Union, West Virginia on January 21, 1909. He graduated from Princeton University in 1930. During World War II he was a major in the Army Air Force. He died in Cabell, West Virginia, on June 15, 1973, aged 64.

Works 
He wrote about 150 short stories which were printed in Vogue, Ladies Home Journal, The Saturday Evening Post, and Cosmopolitan.

Books 
 1962: Practise to Deceive (13 stories)
 Five cookbooks

Films 
 1937: New Faces of 1937. Based on the story "Shoestring" 
 1939: The Lady and the Mob. Story "Old Mrs. Leonard and the Machine Guns"
 1939: Second Fiddle. Story "When Winter Comes"
 1952: The Bad and the Beautiful. Story "Of Good and Evil" (longer version is called Memorial to a Bad Man). Charles Schnee received Academy Award for Best Adapted Screenplay
 1953: Letter to Loretta (TV Series), episode "Love Story".  
 1958: Matinee Theatre (TV Series),  episode "The Phony Venus".
 1966: How to Steal a Million, based on a story "Venus Rising" in Practise to Deceive

References

External links 
 

1909 births
1973 deaths
20th-century American novelists